Mike McMeeken (born 10 May 1994) is an English professional rugby league footballer who plays as a  forward for the Catalans Dragons in the Betfred Super League and England at international level.

He started his career in the Super League with the London Broncos, also playing on loan in League 1 at the London Skolars before joining the Tigers (Heritage № 956) in 2015. He joined Catalans Dragons in December 2020, ahead of the 2021 season.

Background
McMeeken was born in Basingstoke, and raised in Fleet, Hampshire, England. 

He initially played rugby union from an early age, but was introduced to rugby league at ten years old, and began playing for amateur side West London Sharks. He started his professional career at London Broncos, making his senior début in 2012.

Club career
Following London's relegation from Super League at the end of the 2014 season, McMeeken joined Castleford Tigers on a two-year deal.

He signed a two-year extension to the already existing contract keeping him at Castleford until 2018.

He played in the 2017 Super League Grand Final defeat by Leeds at Old Trafford.

On 9 October 2021, he played for Catalans Dragons in their 2021 Super League Grand Final defeat against St. Helens.

International career
In 2011, McMeeken was selected in the England academy squad.

In 2017, McMeeken made his international début for the England senior team in the 30–10 victory over Samoa in Campbelltown Australia.

He was also included in the England elite performance squad announced by coach Wayne Bennett May 2017

In October 2017 he was selected in the England squad for the 2017 Rugby League World Cup.

References

External links

Castleford Tigers profile
(archived by web.archive.org) Profile at castigers.com
SL profile
2017 Statistics at rlwc2017.com
England profile

1994 births
Living people
Castleford Tigers players
Catalans Dragons players
England national rugby league team players
English rugby league players
London Broncos players
London Skolars players
Rugby league players from Basingstoke
Rugby league second-rows